Westhill (Gaelic: Cnoc Shuas) is a commuter village on the eastern outskirts of the city of Inverness, in the Highland council area of Scotland.

References

Populated places in Inverness committee area
Areas of Inverness